Jalan Rekreasi Tupah (Kedah State Road 165) is major road to Rekreasi Tupah in the Kedah in Malaysia. It connects Jalan Pantai Barat Kedah to Rekreasi Tupah Recreation Park with a length of 4 km.

Junctions and towns

Roads in Kedah